The Sintung Sugar Factory Culture Park is a former sugar refinery which has been turned into a multi-purpose park located in Dulan Village, Donghe Township, Taitung County, Taiwan.

History
The culture park used to be a private sugar refinery operating in the region which was built during the Japanese rule of Taiwan. During the World War II, the refinery was bombed. After it had ceased to operation in 1991, a group of art workers moved in and revived the building with the help of Taitung County Government. It was then transformed into showrooms and studios.

Architecture
The culture park consists of bed and breakfast, handicraft shop, coffee house etc. It is mostly made of pebbles, steel bars and driftwood.

Events
The culture park regularly holds various events such as live concerts and dances.

See also
 List of tourist attractions in Taiwan

References

Buildings and structures in Taitung County
Sugar refineries in Taiwan